Josh Becker may refer to:

 Josh Becker (filmmaker) (born 1958), American film and television writer and director
 Josh Becker (politician) (born 1969), American politician